Sulemana Alhassan is a Ghanaian politician and a member of the New Patriotic Party in Ghana. He is the Upper West Regional minister of Ghana. He was appointed by President Nana Addo Danquah Akuffo-Addo in January 2017 and was approved by the Members of Parliament in February 2017.

References

New Patriotic Party politicians
People from Upper West Region
21st-century Ghanaian politicians